The 2020 Uzbekistan First League is the 29th since its establishment. The competition started on 17 March 2020.

Teams and locations

Foreign Players

League table

Results

See also
2020 Uzbekistan Super League
2020 Uzbekistan Pro League
2020 Uzbekistan Second League
2020 Uzbekistan Cup
2020 Uzbekistan League Cup

References

External links 
 
Uzbekistan Pro League at PFL.uz
Uzbekistan Pro League News

Uzbekistan Pro-B League
Uzbekistan
2020 in Uzbekistani football leagues
Uzbekistan Super League